The Saddlehorn Utility Area Historic District in Colorado National Monument comprises a complex of park service buildings, designed by the National Park Service Branch of Plans and Designs in the National Park Service Rustic style. The primary designer was National Park Service architect Kenneth M. Saunders, who employed the local red sandstone in the buildings, which included shops, fuel shed, repair and storage buildings.  The buildings were constructed in 1941 by Public Works Administration and Civilian Conservation Corps labor.

The utility area is located at the intersection of Rim Rock Drive and the Saddle horn Loop, named after a distinctive nearby rock formation. It is separated from the caretaker's house by a low hill. Construction was carried out by craftsmen, known as LEM's (Local Experienced Men), with suitable skills, reputedly stonemasons of Italian descent. Much of the material came from Rim Rock Drive construction.

The three Saddlehorn National Register properties were nominated to the National Register of Historic Places as a multiple property submission on the basis of their related design and history. The utility area was built by CCC camp NM-2-C.

See also
Saddlehorn Comfort Station

References

External links

Park buildings and structures on the National Register of Historic Places in Colorado
Government buildings completed in 1941
National Park Service rustic in Colorado
National Register of Historic Places in Colorado National Monument
Historic districts on the National Register of Historic Places in Colorado
Civilian Conservation Corps in Colorado
Historic American Buildings Survey in Colorado